is a railway station in Ichikai, Tochigi Prefecture, Japan, operated by the Mooka Railway.

Lines
Tatara Station is a station on the Mooka Line, and is located 31.2 rail kilometers from the terminus of the line at Shimodate Station.

Station layout
Tatara Station has a single side platform serving traffic in both directions. The station is unattended.

History
Tatara Station opened on 1 April 1955. The station was absorbed into the JR East network upon the privatization of the JNR on 1 April 1987, and the Mooka Railway from 11 April 1988.

Surrounding area
Taiheiyo Country Club

References

External links

 Mooka Railway Station information 

Railway stations in Tochigi Prefecture
Railway stations in Japan opened in 1955
Ichikai, Tochigi